Ganga Gowri is a 1973 Indian Tamil-language Hindu mythological film, directed and produced by B. R. Panthulu. The film stars Gemini Ganesan and Jayalalithaa & Jayanthi with music composed by M. S. Viswanathan. It is a remake of Panthulu's own 1967 Kannada film Gange Gowri. The film was released on 16 January 1973, and emerged a commercial success.

Plot

Cast 
Gemini Ganesan as Lord Shiva
Jayalalithaa as Ganga
Jayanthi as Dakshayani / Gowri
Cho as Lord Narada
O. A. K. Thevar as Saniswaran
S. A. Ashokan as Fisherman's leader
Sivakumar as Narayanan or Mahadevan
Thengai Srinivasan as Subbuni
Manorama as Kumutha / Katha kalakshepam singer (Story Narrator)
Poornam Viswanathan as Gowri's father
C. K. Saraswathi as Akilandam / Gowri's stepmother
Kumari Padmini as Narada's female incarnation
Geethanjali as Lakshmi

Production 
The film was shot at Premier Studio, Mysore. Ganesan took dancing lessons to portray Shiva in the film.

Soundtrack 
The music was composed by M. S. Viswanathan, with lyrics by Kannadasan. The song "Andharangam Naan Ariven" is set in the Hindustani raga Bageshri, and "Azhagiya Megangal" is set to Amritavarshini, a Carnatic raga.

References

External links 
 

1970s Tamil-language films
1973 films
Films directed by B. R. Panthulu
Films scored by M. S. Viswanathan
Hindu mythological films
Tamil remakes of Kannada films